Lewisburg is an unincorporated community in Benton County, Oregon, United States.  Lewisburg lies at the intersection of Oregon Route 99W and Lewisburg Avenue.  Lewisburg is north of Corvallis and west of Albany.

The 1911 Lewisburg Hall and Warehouse Company Building, listed on the National Register of Historic Places, is located in the community.  The building is also known as "Mountain View Grange No. 429". It is currently used as an Eastern Orthodox church, and special events center.

References

Unincorporated communities in Benton County, Oregon
1911 establishments in Oregon
Unincorporated communities in Oregon